Bradley A. Winchester (born March 1, 1981) is an American former professional ice hockey left winger. He was selected in the second round of the 2000 NHL Entry Draft, 35th overall, by the Edmonton Oilers.

Playing career
Winchester spent two seasons with the U.S. National Team Development Program,  then moved to his hometown University of Wisconsin–Madison, where he played for four seasons.  At six feet, five inches tall and 228 pounds, was the largest player the Oilers had drafted since the 1995 NHL Entry Draft. In December 2000, Winchester participated in the World Junior Hockey Championship with the United States, finishing in fourth position.

Winchester made his professional debut in the 2003–04 American Hockey League season, playing for Edmonton's farm affiliate, the Toronto Roadrunners. He moved with the team to Edmonton during the 2004–05 NHL lockout, where he tied for the team lead in goals and was six points behind Tony Salmelainen and Raffi Torres for the team scoring lead. Winchester split 2005–06 between the Oilers and the Hamilton Bulldogs, going scoreless during the NHL regular season but scoring the game-winning goal in his playoff debut, the second game of a series with the number one seeded Detroit Red Wings. His goal gave the eighth seeded Oilers their first win in the series on the road. The Oilers went on to lose to the Carolina Hurricanes in seven games of the Stanley Cup final, with Winchester spending most of the latter games as a healthy scratch.

On June 26, 2007, the Oilers declined to make Winchester a qualifying offer, which allowed him to become an unrestricted free agent as of July 1, and on the 6th, he signed with the Dallas Stars. After playing in 41 games for Dallas in 2007–08, Winchester signed with the St. Louis Blues on July 10, 2008. He was recalled from the Blues' Peoria Rivermen (AHL) affiliate on November 20, 2008.

On February 28, 2011, Winchester was traded from the Blues to the Anaheim Ducks for a 3rd round draft pick in 2012.

On October 3, 2011, Winchester signed a one-year, $725,000 deal with the San Jose Sharks.

A free agent through the duration of the 2012–13 NHL lockout, Winchester accepted a try-out to the Calgary Flames training camp once the dispute was resolved on January 12, 2013. At the conclusion of camp, Winchester was unsuccessful and released by the Flames. On January 22, midway through the 2012–13 AHL season, Winchester signed a professional try-out with the Milwaukee Admirals.

On July 24, 2013, Winchester agreed to a one-year contract as a free agent with the Chicago Blackhawks. He was assigned to AHL affiliate, the Rockford IceHogs, to start the 2013–14 season. On February 26, 2014, Winchester was traded by the Blackhawks to the Minnesota Wild in exchange for Brian Connelly. Winchester was not re-signed by the Wild after the conclusion of the season and on September 11, 2014, the Norfolk Admirals announced they had signed him. Winchester recorded 9 points in 15 games before suffering a shoulder injury with the Admirals on January 15, 2015. Winchester was traded by Norfolk to the Oklahoma City Barons for future considerations on March 6, 2015.

On September 17, 2015, Winchester announced he was retiring from professional hockey.

Personal
In December 2012, Brad and his father, the former NCAA standout Gary Winchester, were honored by the Wisconsin Badgers when they were selected as honorary captains for the team's games held on December 13 and 14.

Career statistics

Regular season and playoffs

International

References

External links

1981 births
American men's ice hockey left wingers
Anaheim Ducks players
Edmonton Oilers draft picks
Edmonton Oilers players
Edmonton Road Runners players
Dallas Stars players
Hamilton Bulldogs (AHL) players
Ice hockey players from Wisconsin
Iowa Stars players
Iowa Wild players
Living people
Milwaukee Admirals players
Norfolk Admirals players
Oklahoma City Barons players
Peoria Rivermen (AHL) players
Rockford IceHogs (AHL) players
St. Louis Blues players
San Jose Sharks players
Sportspeople from Madison, Wisconsin
Toronto Roadrunners players
Wisconsin Badgers men's ice hockey players